Admiral Senyavin may refer to:

 Dmitry Senyavin
 Soviet cruiser Admiral Senyavin
 Russian coast defense ship Admiral Seniavin
 Alexei Senyavin
 Naum Senyavin